was a Japanese photographer. After three years of Army service he began his career as a photographer with the Japanese propaganda magazine FRONT, in 1943. In September 1945 he was one of two photographers assigned by the Special Committee for the Investigation of A-bomb Damage to document the aftermath of the Atomic bombings of Hiroshima and Nagasaki. In subsequent decades he worked as a commercial photographer. He died in 2002 at the age of 84.

References

Japanese photographers
1918 births
2002 deaths
Imperial Japanese Army soldiers